A Product of... (sometimes known as A Product of... Participation) is the first studio album by the English pop group, the Thompson Twins. It was released in June 1981 on the T Records imprint, a label created by the band and distributed through the Fame/EMI label. At the time of its release, the band were a six-piece group that did not include later member Alannah Currie (although she is thanked in the credits for "playing and singing" on the record). In comparison to the glamour of their later years, the group had a somewhat scruffy image during this period, because they were very poor and living in squats in London.

The self-produced album had a post-punk sound that was heavily influenced by African rhythms and chants. The band had already built a strong reputation for themselves due to their live shows, where often members of the audience were encouraged to join the band onstage and pound along with them on makeshift percussion such as hubcaps and pieces of metal.

All of the songs on the album were written by the band themselves, except for two ethnic traditionals, both arranged by Tom Bailey.

In September 2008, the band's first two albums, A Product of... and Set, were released as a double CD. This version included their earliest singles, non-album tracks, and extended remixes.

Track listing
All tracks composed by Thompson Twins; except where indicated

Original album
 "When I See You"
 "Politics"
 "Slave Trade"
 "Could Be Her...Could Be You"
 "Make Believe"
 "Don't Go Away"
 "The Price"
 "Oumma Aularesso (Animal Laugh)" (Traditional from Sierra Leone; arranged by Tom Bailey)
 "Anything Is Good Enough"
 "A Product Of..."
 "Perfect Game"
 "Vendredi Saint" (Traditiional Gregorian chant; arranged by Tom Bailey)

2008 re-issue bonus tracks
 "Squares and Triangles"
 "Could Be Her...Could Be You" (original version)
 "Weather Station" (written and recorded by Bailey for the independent film The Onlooker)
 "Modern Plumbing" (written by Bailey; recorded by the Blankets, a separate group that included him)
 "She's in Love With Mystery"
 "Fast Food"
 "Food Style"
 "Oumma Aularesso (Animal Laugh)" (original remixed extended version)
 "A Dub Product"
 "Make Believe (Let's Pretend)" (extended version)
 "Lama Sabach Tani"

Personnel
 Tom Bailey – bass, lead vocals, keyboards, percussion, reeds
 Chris Bell – drums, backing vocals, percussion
 Peter Dodd – guitar, backing vocals, percussion, saxophone
 Joe Leeway – congas, backing vocals, percussion
 John Roog – guitar, backing vocals, percussion
 Jane Shorter – saxophone, percussion
Technical
Steve Dewey - engineer, mixing
Alan O'Duffy, John Hade, Tom Bailey - mixing
Jonathan Phipps - cover art

References

1981 debut albums
Thompson Twins albums
Albums produced by Mike Howlett
EMI Records albums